Players Championship  may refer to:

 The Players Championship, a PGA Tour golf event since 1974
 Players Championship Finals, a PDC darts tournament since 2009
 Players' Championship, a Grand Slam curling event since 1993
 Players Championship (snooker), a professional snooker tournament since 2017
 2004 Players Championship (snooker), a professional snooker tournament held in 2004. 
 Players Tour Championship, a series of snooker tournaments held 2010–2016, and sometimes referred to as the Player's Championship in its first year